Tucumania is a genus of snout moths in the subfamily Phycitinae. It was described by Harrison Gray Dyar Jr. in 1925. Some sources list it as a synonym of Zophodia, while others retain it as a valid genus.

Species
 Tucumania porrecta Dyar, 1925
 Tucumania tapiacola Dyar, 1925

References

Phycitini
Pyralidae genera